Bell Ville is a city in center-south of the province of Córdoba, Argentina, located 200 km southeast from the capital Córdoba City, on the intersection of National Route 9 and Provincial Route 3 with the Córdoba–Rosario–Buenos Aires railroad.

Besides primary activities like agriculture (soybeans, wheat, sunflowers, maize) and cattle farming, and secondary ones (elaborated products of the aforementioned), Bell Ville has a peculiar local industry: the manufacturing of footballs. The city prides itself in being the "National Capital of the Football".

History 
The origin of Bell Ville's current city is located in 1630 when the couple constituted by Lorenzo de Lara and Mimenza and Marcela of Mendoza created the so-called stay "Our Lady of the Pure and Clean Concepcion", though the place already was known as Dead Friar because between the carob groves the corpse of a Catholic priest was found apparently dead for jaguars or pumas.

In the first thirty years of the 19th century the zone was a battlefield between the Creoles and the ranqueles, as well as field of combat between "federal" and "unitary", happening in 1818 in the surrounding areas the fratricidal combat between the troops supervised by Juan Bautista Bustos and the troops under the order of Estanislao López. The second half of the 1860s the real development of the population began with the construction of the tracing of the Central Argentine Railroad that would join - between other cities - Buenos Aires with Córdoba.

At the end of 1870 when the First Industrial Exhibition travel for the above-mentioned railroad the president at the time Domingo Faustino Sarmiento to inaugurate Argentina realized in the city of Córdoba (1871), and to have to stop in the railway station so called "Dead Friar", he decided to change the name of the railway station, naming it Bell Ville for a double motive: the paronomasia with Beautiful Villa in honoring to the Scottish colonists from Dunbar, Antonio and Ricardo Bell, who established themselves in the place and they had initiated an agriculture and modern ranching (cattle) in the zone. In 1872 the whole population happened to be call Bell Ville.

From the second half of the 19th century the population received great quantity of immigrants proceeding from Europe, and it obtained the range of city on August 17, 1908.

Demographics 
Descendants from second to fourth generation of European immigrants (Argentine descendants of mostly English, Italians, Spanish, Scotch and Irish) populate Bell Ville, Argentina.
Population at 2010 Census : 34439

Economy 
As other cities of the Humid Pampas, in spite of the crises, is a prosperous city which economy is based on the sectors primarily and secondarily, that is to say on the cultures (soybean, wheat, sunflower, maize) and ranching (cattle) (vaccinates) of environment and in the production and industrialization of the agricultural raw materials (this way the industry is principally food, though also industries related to the machinery).
Nevertheless, the industry bellvillense its curiosities: this city attributes the invention of the ball to itself of football without touch and possesses 11 small and medium companies originated in the confection of balls of football, grouped in the Manufacturers' Argentine Circle of Balls and Related (CAFABA). The major one of them has 30 personnel and 150 dressmakers.

Notable natives 

 Poet and writer Hilario Ascasubi
 Footballer Mario Kempes
 Footballer Hugo Curioni
 Goalkeeper Mauricio Caranta
 Footballer Silvio Carrario
 Footballer Osvaldo Ardiles
 Footballer Hernán Barcos

Sister cities 

  - Yongkang,  China (2004)
  - Bricherasio,  Italy (1998)

Image gallery

Contemporary

Historic (c. 1957)

2008 Bell Ville rally championship 

In the year 2008 was the presentation of Bell Ville rally championship , third date in the province championship; there were 3 days of competition: one of presentation and two of competition.

References

 Municipalidad de Bell Ville
 

Populated places in Córdoba Province, Argentina
Cities in Argentina
Córdoba Province, Argentina
Argentina